Steve F. Anderson (1963) is Professor of Digital Media at the UCLA School of Theater, Film and Television. Previously, he served as founding director of the Ph.D. program in Media Arts and Practice at the USC School of Cinematic Arts and an Associate Professor in the USC Interactive Media & Games Division. He co-edits the interdisciplinary electronic journal Vectors Journal of Culture and Technology in a Dynamic Vernacular and is the founder of Critical Commons, an online media archive and fair use advocacy network. He is author of the books Technologies of Vision: The War Between Data and Images (MIT 2018) and Technologies of History: Visual Media and the Eccentricity of the Past (Dartmouth 2011). With Christie Milliken he is co-editor of the anthology Reclaiming Popular Documentary (Indiana University Press 2021). 

Technologies of History marks an intervention in the academic sub-field of Film and History, which has largely focused on the accuracy and verifiability of cinematic and televisual history, especially in the genres of documentary and historical epics. Anderson's book advocates consideration of the historiographical value of non-traditional (what he terms "eccentric") forms of visual history including experimental film and video, fake documentary, found footage, science fiction time travel and digital games. D. L. LeMahieu's book review in the journal Film & History notes that "Anderson’s validation of the idiosyncratic and experimental opens new areas of research and analysis for historians." 

Anderson is also known for his contributions to the fields of digital humanities, scholarly electronic publishing, fair use advocacy and technocultural studies. He received his Ph.D. in 2001 from the Film, Literature & Culture program at the University of Southern California under the direction of Professors David James, Marita Sturken and Leo Braudy and an MFA in Film and Video from CalArts in 1990. He was awarded a grant from the HASTAC/MacArthur Foundation Digital Media and Learning competition in 2008 to create the public media archive Critical Commons and in 2014-15 he received a prestigious Digital Innovation Fellowship from the American Council of Learned Societies (ACLS) to support his project "Technologies of Cinema: A Critical Digital Archive and Multimodal History of the American Technocultural Imaginary."

References

External links
 Technologies of Vision
 Critical Commons
 Vectors Journal
 Technologies of History
 Biography

UCLA School of Theater, Film and Television faculty
Living people
1963 births
USC School of Cinematic Arts alumni
California Institute of the Arts alumni